Sphecosoma roseipuncta is a moth in the subfamily Arctiinae. It was described by Schaus in 1920. It is found in Guatemala.

References

Natural History Museum Lepidoptera generic names catalog

Moths described in 1920
Sphecosoma